The Legend of Sword and Fairy 7, also known as Sword and Fairy 7 or Chinese Paladin 7, is a xianxia/shenmo-themed fantasy action-adventure role-playing video game developed by Softstar Entertainment (Beijing) and China Mobile Games & Entertainment Group (CMGE). It is the ninth installment in The Legend of Sword and Fairy video game series, preceded by The Legend of Sword and Fairy 6 (2015). Its story is set about 100 years after the events of The Legend of Sword and Fairy 2, with numerous homages to previous games and a few of the characters from the second, third and fourth game even making cameo appearances.

The game is primarily made for the PC platform, and is available for digital distribution on Steam. The English-localized version was released for the PlayStation 4, PlayStation 5, Xbox One and Xbox Series X/S in 2022 under the name Sword and Fairy: Together Forever.

Development 
On May 23, 2017, Yao Zhuangxian announced that the project was established as the successor of The Legend of Sword and Fairy 6. Public beta was released on February 2, 2021 for free. Some beta players were also invited to provide feedback.

Presale of boxed editions (Standard and Premium) started on July 28, both in Chinese Mainland and Taiwan.

On February 14, 2023, Softstar released the first DLC of the game named Dreamlike World (人间如梦), which is a sequel that completes the plot gap between the game's ending and its post-credit scene.

Gameplay 
Unlike the turn-based battle mechanics used by the previous games of the series, The Legend of Sword and Fairy 7 uses a 3D third-person in a semi-open world setting and a real-time hack and slash style of action gameplay with no pauses between exploration and combats.  The game consists of multiple major locations, each being an open-world map with numerous sub-regions that the character can explore freely on foot, encountering and interacting with various NPCs, enemy mobs and treasure chests along the way. The player can also choose to "fly" directly to another area (as the main protagonist has a bird fairy that typically serve as a mount) to save time, and flying is the only option to travel between major locations as there are no open-world maps between them.

When encountering friendly NPCs, a dialogue mark will appear above their head with hints of the conversation content, and dubbed greetings and background talkings will play when the player gets nearby. Nearby hostile NPCs will have a target mark appear on them, allowing the player to prioritize each enemy and lock onto them to initiate an attack at will. In combat, the player can alternate between light and heavy strikes to trigger different combos, use ranged attacks, or charge up a special move for maximum damage.  When using a team of protagonists, the player can switch readily among team members, and the enemies and boss will often prioritize attacking the character the player is currently controlling. Each enemy defeat will grant experience points and spoil items to the characters, allowing level-ups and acquisition of new skills.

There are numerous mini-games in the game, mainly a card game called "Journey of Heaven and Earth" (天地游) and a platform game called "Leaf Fairy Jump" (叶灵纵), which allow the player to collect trading cards and unlock a hidden fairy servant, as well as a skiing game, a stealth game and a bamboo pole dancing game. The game has a unique "Cooking Mode", which allows the player to use obtained recipes and ingredients to create special dishes with beverages (whenever there is a kitchen or stove nearby on the map) that can provide significant healing, power-ups and buffs for the entire team. There is also a "Photo Mode" that allows the player to aerially tour the map and capture screenshots from any viewing angle.

Plot 
Xiu Wu, a deity warrior tasked to hunt down the leader of a celestial fugitive group, infiltrates the Demon Realm but was discovered and attacked by Garuda soldiers. Fighting off waves after waves of pursuers, Xiu Wu concludes the mission is a failure and decides to retreat, but does not have enough spirit energy remaining to activate his magical Chunzi Sword and open a portal back to the Deity Realm.  After managing to escape to the Yanbo Spring, a forbidden area to the demons, he was intercepted by the demon lord Chonglou, who critically wounds and knocks him off a cliff towards the magma below. However, Chonglou decides not to really kill Xiu Wu and uses the dropped Chunzi Sword to open a portal that allowed him to fall through to the Human Realm.

Meanwhile, in the Human Realm, a young lady-warrior named Yue Qingshu manages to outrun Xiqu, a violent, gigantic bison-like supernatural beast that has threatened the locals for years. On the way back to Mingshu School, her own spiritual cultivation sect, Qingshu discovers a mysterious fruit among the woods and is mesmerized by its spiritual energy into making a light bite before stopping herself. She the sees a young boy being abducted by an eagle, decides to intervene and successfully saves the boy in an aerial pursuit using her fairy servant bird Qiaoling. The boy, Ziqiu, turns out to be a chosen "divine child" secretly kept under guard by the neighboring Tianshi School, a bitter rival of Mingshu School. Although Qingshu wants to return the boy and avoid trouble, she agrees to let the boy stay and take care of him for a few days. Later that night, a mysterious woman sneaks into Mingshu School and attempts to seize Ziqiu in his sleep, and a mysterious man appears out of nowhere to steal Qingshu's sword and fight off the woman in a superhuman duel. The fight causes a section of the garden wall to collapse and crush Qingshu's aging grandfather, but Ziqiu reveals a magical power that seemingly reverses time, repairing the wall and reviving the grandfather. Shocked and confused, Qingshu decides to interrogate the exhausted mysterious man the following morning, but is distracted to rescue villagers under attack by suddenly appeared feral monsters. When Xiqu also appears, Qingshu attempts to draw it away from the village, but crashes off her flight after being hit by falling boulders. Suddenly the mysterious man arrives to save her and singlehandedly slays the bison beast in a spectacular fight. Ziqiu then also arrives and transforms into the avatar of a deity minister named Aoxu, and the mysterious man reveals himself as the deity warrior Xiu Wu, who was previously reverted back to his primordial form as a divine fruit after being injured. Because of Qingshu's bite the previous day, they are accidentally locked in a magical symbiosis, and Xiu Wu needs to stay near her to recover and will grow weaker if kept away.

Qingshu's grandfather convinces Xiu Wu to join Mingshu School as a disciple so he can legitimately stay close to Qingshu. The two soon have to rush over to Tianshi Sect, who are under attack from the celestial rebel leader Kuiyu (the fugitive deity that Xiu Wu was tasked to take down), who is revealed to be in possession of Xiu Wu's Chunzi Sword. After managing to repel the attack, Tianshi Sect's leader Mengzhang gives them a book recording various magical beasts and fairies that may be useful in eliminating the demons and vicious beast. They decided to travel to Changbai Mountains searching for an ice lion fairy, and are joined by Qingshu's childhood friend Bai Moqing, a disciple of Xianxia Sect who is tasked by her master to investigate the vicious beasts. During the trip, they are followed by Sang You, a young Miao physician-warrior who is in love with Moqing. The group then encounter a group of labourers forced by the local fanzhen military to work in an ice crystal mine, and stage a jailbreak to rescue the labourers. However, Moqing accidentally dropped her personal sachet, revealing her identity to the military leaders, who happen to be her older brothers.

(continues...)

Dreamlike World

Characters

Main
 Yue Qingshu (月清疏) — the young lady-disciple from Mingshu School (明庶门) and a fairy-driver in training.
 Xiu Wu (修吾) — a deity warrior who is tasked to traverse among different parallel realms and hunt down fugitives from Heaven.
 Bai Moqing (白茉晴) — a talented young disciple of the Xianxia Sect (仙霞派) who is a sisterly friend to Yue Qingshu.
 Sang You (桑遊) — a Miao young man and the love interest of Bai Moqing, who later becomes the next guardian of the Duzhang Spring (毒瘴泉).

Side 
 Zi Qiu (子秋) — a mysterious, amnesic young boy under the custody of Tianshi School (天师门), who is actually a deity child used as an earthly vessel for Ao Xu's avatar.
 Ao Xu (敖胥) — the overambitious and manipulative celestial guardian of the Chunzi Spring (春滋泉).
 Kui Yu (魁予) — an exiled deity lady-warrior who became the leader of a celestial rebel group Heavenly Demons (天魔众).
 Yue Hanshan (月寒山) — Yue Qingshu's aging grandfather and the headmaster of Mingshu School.
 Meng Zhang (孟章) — the leader of Tianshi School, the neighboring rival sect to Mingshu School.
 Bai Songhuan (白松桓) — the fanzhen general of Lulong in Liaodong, and the eldest brother of Bai Moqing.

Cameo 
Beside supporting roles, some characters in previous games also make cameo appearances in this title.
 Chong Lou (重楼) — the fight-loving but righteous demon lord from The Legend of Sword and Fairy 3, who serves as a self-appointed guardian of the Yanbo Spring.
 Yuxia Zhenren (余霞真人) — Bai Moqing's master and the leader of the Xianxia Sect, who is actually Shen Qishuang (沈欺霜), one of the three female protagonists from The Legend of Sword and Fairy 2.
 Yun'er (蕴儿) — a water fairy from The Legend of Sword and Fairy 2, who can become a fairy servant of Yue Qingshu.
Tianji  Daozhang (天机道长) — a strangely capable old Taoist monk encountered by and teaches the protagonists, suspected by fans to be an aged/immortal Li Xiaoyao (李逍遥), the main protagonist of the original Legend of Sword and Fairy who became the guardian of the Tianji Palace at the end of The Legend of Sword and Fairy 5.
 Jiutian Xuannü (九天玄女) — the overseer of the Deity Realm, who also appeared at the end of The Legend of Sword and Fairy 4.

Music 
The game's theme songs, soundtracks and scores are composed by a combined teamwork from Chen Zhiyi (陈致逸) and Softstar veterans Rizet Tsen (曾志豪), Chi-Yi Lo (駱集益) and ShinRay Woo (吳欣叡), as well as collaboration with the Owl-Song Studio (枭工作室) in Shanghai and Xiaoxu Game Audio (小旭音乐) in Beijing.

Theme song 
 "Together Always" (相守), composed by Chen Zhiyi, sung by Zhou Shen (周深)
 "Sword Swung to Beseeth the Heavens" (挥剑问苍天), composed by Rizet Tsen, sung by Jess Lee (李佳薇)
 "Heavenward Sword" (剑指苍天), composed by Chen Zhiyi, sung by Li Chaochang (李常超)
 "Dreamlike World" (人间如梦), composed by Angel (安九) and Li Jianheng (李建衡), sung by Lou Yixiao (娄艺潇) and Audiofreak (音频怪物, real name Li Nan 李楠)

Reception

Positive 
GamingBolt gave a positive review on the game's story-telling and excellent visuals. Other reviews on YouTube also praised the game for its musical and graphical presentation, as well as the immersive portrayal of Chinese culture and mythology.

Negative 
Many Chinese game reviewers complained about gameplay bugs which affected early versions of the game, like falling from terrain that had not been properly loaded or the sudden disappearance of characters during boss fights. The gameplay and modeling optimizations from the initial version has been described as being very poor, and the game is quite demanding on hardware specification, especially when ray tracing is enabled. Most of the early glitches were fixed in subsequent software patches.

The console version reported certain cutscenes in the game where the video and audio tracks are out of sync. The English localization was also criticized for having small, poorly contrasted fonts that are hard to read sometimes.

Some reviewers described this title as being overly targeted towards nostalgic fans of the franchise, as many subplots are purely there to serve homages to previous games. The combat system was also criticised for being mediocre and lacking the weapon collision feedbacks that are common among modern AAA action games.

References

External links 

  Official website (Taiwan)
  Official website (China)
  Official The Legend of Sword and Fairy website
  Softstar's website

7
2021 video games
Fantasy video games
PlayStation 4 games
PlayStation 5 games
Role-playing video games
Single-player video games
Unreal Engine games
Video game sequels
Video games about time travel
Video games based on Chinese mythology
Video games developed in Taiwan
Video games featuring female protagonists
Video games set in Imperial China
Video games with isometric graphics
Windows games